King Arthur: Prince on White Horse, known in Japan as , is a Japanese anime series based on the Arthurian legend. It is a sequel to the earlier series King Arthur and the Knights of the Round Table, reworked in a futuristic setting. Produced by Toei Animation, it was released between April 6 and September 21, 1980, and consisted of 22 half-hour episodes.

Translation
The series is in 22 parts and was translated into several languages:
King Arthur 2ème série (French)
King Arthur: Prince on White Horse (English)
La spada di King Arthur (Italian)
Prinz Arthus (German)

Japanese cast
Akira Kamiya as Arthur
Chikao Ohtsuka as Bossman
Keiko Yamamoto as Pete
Isamu Tanonaka as Sandee
Kouji Totani as Baron

Episode titles
1980-04-06 Frightful! The Spaceship that Hovers in the Sky
1980-04-13 Shocked! Bear-man Appears
1980-04-20 Do not Take out the Hand that Holds the Secret Coin
1980-04-27 Capture the Thief!
1980-05-04 One Man! Rescue Peet
1980-05-11 The Magical Flower which Takes Away Lives
1980-05-25 Defeat the Evil Heir
1980-06-01 Who is the Imposter!
1980-06-08 Baseball Relay
1980-06-15 Ride on, Wild Pony
1980-06-22 Protect the Princess from the Pirate Ship
1980-06-29 The Rose Flower which Scatters Love
1980-07-06 Who? The True Identity of the King from the North
1980-07-20 Wonderful Comrades
1980-07-27 Weird! Phantom Princess Ginebia
1980-08-03 The Dragon that Spurts out Fire and the Youth
1980-08-10 The Black-Horsed Knight who is Shrouded in Mystery
1980-08-17 The Shining Fairy Rainbow
1980-08-24 Appearance of the Phantom Mermaid
1980-09-07 Spirit of the Tragic Snow Queen
1980-09-14 Heated Battle! The Last Heir
1980-09-21 Prince Arthur's Victory

External links
 

1980 anime television series debuts
Adventure anime and manga
Television series based on Arthurian legend
Fuji TV original programming
Toei Animation television